BET's Listening Party is the second album by R&B group Jade. It was released in summer of 1993 and is a live album.

Track listing 
"Settle Down"
"Intro"
"I Wanna Love You"
"Don't Walk Away (Intro)" 
"Don't Ask My Neighbors" 
"Blessed" 
"Mr. Do Right"
"One Woman"
"Do Me Baby"
"I Want 'Cha Baby"
"Rock Steady"
"Don't Walk Away"

1993 live albums
Giant Records (Warner) live albums
Jade (American group) albums